The term "new generation" or "new breed" of African leaders was a buzzword that was widely used in the mid-to-late 1990s to express optimism in a new generation of African leadership.  It has since fallen out of favour, along with several of the leaders for which the term was used.

Description 
In the 1980s and 1990s, increasingly-many countries in Sub-Saharan Africa were holding multiparty elections. The Cold War, the proxy wars of the United States and Soviet Union, as well as apartheid in South Africa, had come to an end. A new generation of African leaders had been anointed who promised to transform their continent. The dream was dubbed the African Renaissance. The concept is often defined in contrast to the big man syndrome, the autocratic rule by the so-called "big men" of African politics during the first two decades after independence.

When US President Bill Clinton made his African journey in March 1998, he helped popularize this notion when he said he placed hope in a "new generation of African leaders" devoted to democracy and economic reforms. Although Clinton did not identify the African leaders by name, it is generally assumed that he was referring to, among others, Yoweri Museveni of Uganda, Paul Kagame of Rwanda, Meles Zenawi of Ethiopia and Isaias Afewerki of Eritrea. Other leaders were later added that list, including Ghana's Jerry Rawlings, Mozambique's Joaquim Chissano and South Africa's Thabo Mbeki.

In contrast, the champions of African independence in the 1960s, such as Kwame Nkrumah, Julius Nyerere, Patrice Lumumba, Jomo Kenyatta, Kenneth Kaunda, Robert Mugabe, and occasionally the diasporan Pan-Africanists W. E. B. Du Bois and Marcus Garvey are sometimes called "the old generation of African leaders" (in the 1960s they were also called "new generation of nationalist leaders", "new generation of Pan-Africanists" and ironically "new generation of African leaders").

Criticism 
With the outbreak of the Second Congo War and the Eritrean-Ethiopian War, many of the "new generation of African leaders" warred against one another, and optimism was lost. Furthermore, many of the leaders failed to deliver adequate democracy, peace, and development and had an inclination to cling to power.

In 2010, the Ghanaian economist George Ayittey characterized the "new and angry generation of young African graduates and professionals" as the "Cheetah Generation", which could look at Africa's problems from a fresh perspective, apart from the failed governmental policies of the "Hippo Generation" of leaders, which was still in a "1960s-era mentality". Ayittey saw in that little difference between the currently-ruling "new generation of African leaders" and their predecessors dating from the 1960s.

Other uses 

The notion of a "new generation of African leaders" has also come to mean not only the above named presidents, but also a vision of a new breed of African politicians, civil servants, business leaders etc.

The similar term "new generation of black leaders" is also used, albeit mostly in the context of diasporan Africa.

See also

Big man (political science)
Foreign policy of the Bill Clinton administration
Africa Rising
Neopatrimonialism
Politics of the Belly

References

"New-Breed" Leadership, Conflict, and Reconstruction in the Great Lakes Region of Africa: A Sociopolitical Biography of Uganda's Yoweri Kaguta Museveni, Joseph Oloka-Onyango, Africa Today - Volume 50, Number 3, Spring 2004, p. 29
 Irrational Exuberance: The Clinton Administration in Africa, Peter Rosenblum, Current History 101:195-202, 2002 (subscription required)

External links
"Africa's 'new generation' linked to old", ethiomedia.com February 20, 2006
"Africa's Game of Follow the Leader", Time Magazine, November 26, 2005

Politics of Africa
Presidency of Bill Clinton
Presidency of George W. Bush
1980s in Africa
1980s in politics
1990s in Africa
1990s in politics
2000s in Africa
2000s in politics